Waylla Ch'utu (Aymara waylla Stipa obtusa, a kind of feather grass, ch'utu peak of a mountain, "Stipa obtusa peak", also spelled Huaylla Chutu) is a  mountain in the Andes of Bolivia. It is located in the Oruro Department, Challapata Province, Challapata Municipality. Waylla Ch'utu lies at the Crucero River, southwest of Llallawa.

References 

Mountains of Oruro Department